The name Zhukov often refers to Georgy Zhukov (1896–1974), a Soviet military leader. It may also refer to:

Zhukov (surname)
Zhukov (inhabited locality), name of several inhabited localities in Russia
2132 Zhukov, an asteroid named after Georgy Zhukov
USS Zhukov (NCC-62136), a Federation Ambassador class starship in the fictional Star Trek universe, named after Georgy Zhukov

See also
Žukov (disambiguation)
Zhukovo
Zhukovsky (disambiguation)